Janneken Øverland (born 22 August 1946) is a Norwegian editor, biographer and publishing house executive. She was born in Stavanger. She edited the literary magazine Vinduet from 1980 to 1984. She was co-editor of the three-volume Norsk kvinnelitteraturhistorie (1988-1990), and has written a biography on Cora Sandel. From 1997 until her retirement in 2013 she was editorial manager for the publishing house Gyldendal Norsk Forlag, responsible for translated literature.

References

1946 births
Living people
People from Stavanger
Norwegian magazine editors
Women biographers
Norwegian women editors
Norwegian biographers